Dr. Čeněk Klika was a Czech Scouting official who served as the first chairman of Junák, the organization which, in 1914, was formed in the Czechoslovakian part of the Austro-Hungarian Empire which was designated as independent Czechoslovakia at the end of World War I.

References

Czech people
Scouting pioneers
Year of birth missing
Year of death missing
Scouting and Guiding in the Czech Republic
Place of birth missing
Place of death missing